NA-102 Faisalabad-VIII is a constituency for the National Assembly of Pakistan.

Members of Parliament

2018-2022: NA-108 Faisalabad-VIII

Election 2002 

General elections were held on 10 Oct 2002. Haji Muhammad Fazal Karim of PML-N won by 37,049 votes.

Election 2008 

General elections were held on 18 Feb 2008. Haji Muhammad Fazal Karim of PML-N won by 62,889 votes.

Election 2013 

General elections were held on 11 May 2013. Rana Muhammad Afzal Khan of PML-N won by 126,349 votes and became the  member of National Assembly.

Election 2018 
General elections were held on 25 July 2018.

By-election 2022 
A by-election was held on 16 October 2022 due to the resignation of Farrukh Habib, the previous MNA from this seat.

By-election 2023 
A by-election will be held on 30 April 2023 due to the vacation of this seat by Imran Khan, who won it in the 2022 by-election.

See also
NA-101 Faisalabad-VII
NA-103 Faisalabad-IX

References 

NA-084